The 1963 FA Cup final was the final of the 1962–63 FA Cup, the 82nd season of England's premier club football competition. The match was played at Wembley Stadium (which was fully roofed for the first time) on 25 May 1963 and contested by Manchester United and Leicester City. United won 3–1, with a goal from Denis Law and two from David Herd, lifting the trophy for the third time, while City had now played in three FA Cup finals and had still yet to win the trophy. Ken Keyworth scored the consolation goal for Leicester.

Match

Build-up
Despite fielding nine internationals United had struggled during the season while their opponents City had performed well, doing the league double over United in the process and thus entered the final as slight favourites. The importance of televised coverage came to the fore this year as the two sides tossed for choice of colours despite traditionally wearing red and blue shirts respectively. Those colours would look identical to the viewers on their black and white televisions so Leicester, having lost the toss switched to white.

Game
The opening fifteen minutes of the game were error strewn and Leicester could easily have found themselves three goals in front as United's goalkeeper, David Gaskell, presented them with three opportunities to fire into an unguarded net. On each occasion, Keyworth, Stringfellow and Gibson in turn were unable to finish the moves off with a last-ditch United challenge keeping the scoreline blank.

Having survived the third scare in the fifteenth minute, United took a stranglehold on the match which they never relinquished, peppering Gordon Banks goalmouth with several shots off target before finally taking the lead after half an hour. A Bobby Charlton shot had been saved comfortably by Banks, who then bowled the ball out to Gibson. Paddy Crerand read the throw and raced in to intercept the ball twenty-five yards from the Leicester goal before passing to Denis Law, who turned and fired past Banks and two defenders to open the scoring. Indeed, Law could have had a second goal ten minutes later when he took the ball around Banks but was unable to steer the ball into the goal under pressure from two defenders.

Leicester improved at the start of the second half and were presented with yet another chance by the nervous Gaskell, who dropped the ball at the feet of Cross who was unable to get his shot on target. United though gradually regained their supremacy and deservedly sealed Leicester's fate after fifty-seven minutes when a cross field ball from Giles found Charlton unmarked. He raced into the box and shot at Banks who could only parry the shot into the path of David Herd who tapped into the empty net, triggering victorious choruses of "When the reds go marching in" from the United fans.

Leicester got a lifeline with ten minutes left when a speculative Frank McLintock shot was met by Ken Keyworth, who scored with a well placed diving header. This raised the tension levels but there remained little sign of a Leicester fightback as United continued to dominate with Law hitting the post with a header a minute before the game was finally won in the eighty-fifth minute. The otherwise competent Banks came for a Giles cross and fumbled the ball into the path of Herd, who turned and fired past two defenders on the goal line to complete the victory.

Broadcasting
The game was broadcast live on BBC television as a cup final special edition of Grandstand, making it the 19th cup final to be broadcast live on television. The programme was presented by David Coleman from pitchside, where he spent the build-up to the game interviewing the players and officials as they walked onto the field an hour before kick-off. He then handed over to commentator Ken Wolstenholme, who was acting as the television commentator for his 11th FA Cup final. The match was broadcast in black and white, so the BBC requested that one team change kit, as the red of Manchester United and blue of Leicester would be indistinguishable to the viewers; Leicester was the team to change, wearing their white away kit. A newsreel broadcast was also shown in cinemas that evening by both Pathé and Movietone, both in colour. BBC radio coverage was provided by Raymond Glendenning and Alan Clarke, with a young Brian Moore acting as pitchside reporter.

National anthem
The tradition at the end of the cup final was always to play the national anthem after the cup and medals had been presented but the United players were criticised in the press for not respecting this tradition as they began hoisting Cantwell onto the shoulders of Quixall and Crerand as the band began to play. Nearby journalists had to tell the United players to stop. The practice was done away with from the following season.

Post-match
BBC commentator Kenneth Wolstenholme speculated that United's victory was as a result of their having been more match sharp, having had to play to avoid relegation right to the end of the season while Leicester had lost their sharpness with nothing to play for in the closing weeks of the season.

When interviewed after the match by David Coleman this was a view shared by United manager Matt Busby who felt that his team were a side of big-game players while winning captain Noel Cantwell felt that their poor league placing had made it increasingly hard for the team as the season had gone on. Neither Leicester manager Matt Gillies nor captain Colin Appleton offered any excuses and both merely felt that their side had underperformed on the day and been outplayed by a better team, Appleton adding "I can't understand how that team (United) finished where they did in the league."

Match details

External links
Line-ups

Final
FA Cup Finals
Fa Cup Final 1963
Fa Cup Final 1963
Events at Wembley Stadium
FA Cup Final in the United Kingdom
FA Cup Final